The 1891 European Figure Skating Championships were held on January 23 and 24. Elite figure skaters competed for the title of European Champion in the category of men's singles. The competitors performed only compulsory figures. These were the first European Figure Skating Championships ever.

The skating association of Germany and Austria joined in one club "Deutscher und Österrreichischer Eislaufverband" organised these first European Championships in figure skating in Hamburg, German Empire in 1891 even before the International Skating Union (ISU) was found.

Results

Men

References

Sources
 Result list provided by the ISU

European Figure Skating Championships, 1891
European Figure Skating Championships
European 1891
Sports competitions in Hamburg
1891 in German sport
January 1891 sports events
1890s in Hamburg